Florian Heller (born 10 March 1982 in Rosenheim) is a German football coach and former footballer. He is currently the manager of SpVgg Unterhaching U17.

He made his debut on the professional league level in the 2. Bundesliga for SpVgg Greuther Fürth on 3 August 2003 when he came on as a substitute in the 72nd minute in the game against SpVgg Unterhaching.

References

External links
 

1982 births
Living people
German footballers
Germany youth international footballers
Bundesliga players
2. Bundesliga players
FC Bayern Munich II players
SpVgg Greuther Fürth players
FC Erzgebirge Aue players
1. FSV Mainz 05 players
FC Ingolstadt 04 players
SpVgg Unterhaching players
3. Liga players
Association football midfielders
TSV 1860 Rosenheim players
People from Rosenheim
Sportspeople from Upper Bavaria
Footballers from Bavaria